Boak & Paris was an American architectural firm best known for designing multiple pre-war buildings in Manhattan before and during the Great Depression. It was founded by Russell M. Boak and Hyman F. Paris.

History 

Russell M. Boak and Hyman F. Paris were two alumni of architect Emery Roth, famous for having designed iconic pre-war luxury residential buildings like The San Remo or The Eldorado. Boak and Paris established their own architectural practice in 1927.

Founders

Russell M. Boak 
Russell M. Boak was born on September 25, 1896, in the Bronx, New York. He attended public school and after eighth grade, he started as a draftsman in the office of Emery Roth.

Hyman F. Paris 
Little is known about the early years of Hyman Paris. He was born in Austria. Records indicates that he was not registered as an architect until 1922, and had been employed by George F. Pelham in 1917 and by Emery Roth from 1912 to 1923.

Buildings   
Boak & Paris have designed numerous residential buildings that are now landmark or part of a landmark historic district of the City of New York.

 139 East 94th Street (1928)
152 East 94th Street (1937)
 315 Riverside Drive (1930)
 450 West End Avenue (1931)
45 Christopher Street (1931)
302 West 12th Street (1931)
 336 West End Avenue (1932)
 2624-2626 Broadway (1933)
 143 West 72nd Street (1935)
 5 Riverside Drive (1936)
 3-11 West 86th Street (1937)
 100 Riverside Drive (1938)
 20 Fifth Avenue (1940)

References

Bibliography 
 
 

Defunct architecture firms based in New York City
Design companies established in 1927
Design companies disestablished in 1942
Companies based in Manhattan
1942 disestablishments in New York (state)
1927 establishments in New York City